Big Trouble may refer to:

Music
 Big Trouble (band), an American pop group 1985–1988
 Big Trouble (Big Trouble album), 1988
 Big Trouble (Hazzard Hotrods album) or the title song, 2000
 Big Trouble (Outasight album) or the title song, 2015
 Big Trouble, an album by Hollywood Monsters, 2014

Other uses
 Big Trouble (1986 film), an American comedy film directed by John Cassavetes
 Big Trouble (2002 film), an American comedy film based on Dave Barry's novel (see below)
 Big Trouble (Lukas book), a 1997 non-fiction book by  J. Anthony Lukas
 Big Trouble (novel), a 1999 novel by Dave Barry

See also 
 Big Trouble in Little China
 Big Trouble in Little China (soundtrack)
 Big Trouble in Little China (video game)